Sultan Iskandar Ibni Almarhum Sultan Ismail  (8 April 1932 – 22 January 2010) was the 24th Sultan of Johor and the 4th Sultan of Modern Johor. He succeeded his father Sultan Ismail upon the latter's death on 10 May 1981. He was the eighth Yang di-Pertuan Agong (Supreme King or High King) of Malaysia from 26 April 1984 to 25 April 1989. Sultan Iskandar's reign lasted for almost 29 years until his death in January 2010. His children are married into the different royal houses of Malaysia. His eldest daughter Tunku Kamariah, the Tengku Puan Laksamana, married the Tengku Laksamana of Selangor, Tengku Sulaiman Shah. His successor and eldest son Sultan Ibrahim married Raja Zarith Sofiah of the Perak Royal Family. His daughter Tunku Azizah Aminah Maimunah Iskandariah married the heir apparent of Pahang, now Sultan Abdullah. His younger son Tunku Abdul Majid married a member of the Kedah Royal Family, Tunku Teh Mazni.

As was the case with his grandfather, Sultan Ibrahim, Sultan Iskandar's independent mindset resulted in strained relations with the Malaysian federal government on numerous occasions. This was more so during his days as the Yang di-Pertuan Agong, whereby a number of notable public incidents involved Sultan Iskandar. Nevertheless, Sultan Iskandar was reputed to show great concern to his subjects, and was held in high esteem by many of his subjects–particularly the Malays and Orang Aslis. His time as the Sultan of Johor was marred by accusations of violence and brutality. Sultan Iskandar was notorious for his bad temper which often resulted in violent episodes of rage and brutality to members of his staff and the general public. The 1992 Gomez incident surrounding the Sultan eventually culminated in the removal of "legal immunity" for members of the royal family.

Sultan Iskandar is reputed to have been a staunch disciplinarian, with willingness to occasionally voice personal opinions on governmental issues. On the personal side, subjects who have personally approached the Sultan in his later years described him as a person with a warm and generous personality. However, past critics had also argued that Sultan Iskandar was a person with a turbulent temper. These claims were made by citing records of past notorious incidents, which include an experience of being disinherited from being the Tunku Mahkota of Johor (or Crown Prince in English) by his father, in 1961, as well as a series of alleged criminal acts occurring between the 1970s and the 1990s which were published in the press and provoked widespread moral outrage within the Malaysian public.

During his younger days as a prince, Iskandar was commonly known by his first name, "Mahmood" or his full name "Mahmood Iskandar". He largely discontinued the use of his first name after he became Sultan in 1981, although some people still referred to him by his full name on an occasional basis.

Early life
Sultan Iskandar (known as  Tunku Mahmood Iskandar until 1981) was the third and eldest surviving son of Sultan Ismail ibni Sultan Ibrahim by Sultanah Aminah binti Ungku Ahmad, and was born on at 11:30 am. Friday 8 April 1932 in Istana Semayam, Johor Bahru. (He had two older brothers, both of whom died in infancy.)  Mahmood received his primary and lower secondary education in Ngee Heng Primary School and the English College Johore Bahru (now Maktab Sultan Abu Bakar) in Johor Bahru. In 1952, he was sent to Australia for higher secondary education at the Trinity Grammar School. After completing high school in 1953, Mahmood travelled to the Isle of Wight in the United Kingdom, where he enrolled into the Upper Chine School for three years.

Sultan of Johor

Upon completing his studies, Mahmood returned to Malaysia in 1956 and briefly served as a cadet officer in the Johor Civil Service, taking charge of affairs in District Affairs, Land and Treasury departments until his appointment as the Tunku Mahkota of Johor in May 1959.
Mahmood was appointed the Tunku Mahkota of Johor from 1959 to 1961, and Raja Muda of Johor from 1966 to 1981, by Sultan Ismail. On 29 April 1981, he was re-appointed as the Tunku Mahkota shortly before his father's death.

On 10 May 1981, Mahmood was appointed as the Regent of Johor following the death of his father, and was sworn in as Sultan a day later, shortly before his father was buried. In turn, his younger brother, Tunku Abdul Rahman (not to be confused with Tunku Abdul Rahman, Malaysia's first Prime Minister), formerly the Tunku Mahkota of Johor for twenty years under Sultan Ismail, was demoted to a lower position, the Tunku Bendahara of Johor, a post which he held until his death in 1989. In the same year on 12 December, Sultan Iskandar was appointed as the Chancellor of Universiti Teknologi Malaysia. Unlike the other preceding Sultan of Johors who had their own coronation ceremony, he did not have one.

Under the council of rulers, the elective monarchy system of Malaysia, Sultan Iskandar was elected on 9 February 1984 as the Yang Di-Pertuan Agong, shortly before his predecessor's term expired on 26 April 1984. He succeeded the Sultan of Pahang as the Yang-Di Pertuan Agong on 26 April. A royal investiture was held shortly after that, in which he donned the traditional suit of the Agong, whereby he was officially installed. Sultan Iskandar served in the capacity as the Yang-Di Pertuan Agong until 1989, whereby the Sultan of Perak succeeded him. As the Yang di-Pertuan Agong, Sultan Iskandar was automatically designated under constitutional provisions as the Supreme Commander of the Malaysian Armed Forces, holding the rank of the Marshal of the Royal Malaysian Air Force, Admiral of the Fleet of the Royal Malaysian Navy and Field Marshal of the Army.

On 8 April 2006, the Sultan appointed his grandson Tunku Ismail Idris—the son of the Tunku Mahkota then—as the Raja Muda during an investiture in conjunction on his birthday. The rank of Raja Muda denotes that Ismail is second in position in terms of the order of succession to the Johor royal throne.

State affairs
Sultan Iskandar held annual open house events either at Istana Bukit Serene, his official residence, or at Istana Besar. On these days, the Sultan and his eldest son, the Tunku Mahkota, held special sessions whereby Johoreans came up to pay their respects to him. The Sultan also bestowed honorary awards on distinguished Malaysians from his annual birthday honours list on his birthdays. As a matter of convention, the state government gazetted 8 April as a state public holiday to mark his birthday.

Shortly before he became Agong in April 1984, Sultan Iskandar issued a proposal for the Orang Aslis to be referred to as the "Bumiputera Asli" (literally, Original Sons of the Soil). The proposal was made as Sultan Iskandar suggested that the Orang Aslis maintained a distinct identity from the Malays as the majority of them were not Muslims. The proposal was subsequently scrapped, and the government made subsequent attempts to assimilate the Orang Aslis with the mainstream Malay society. After his inauguration as the Yang di-Pertuan Agong, he donated his Agong's salary to various scholarship boards that were open to Malaysians of all races.

Sultan Iskandar issued a decree in 2007 which only allowed residences and properties owned by the Sultan and the Tunku Mahkota to be called Istana, while properties belonging to other members of the royal family are to be known as "Kediaman". The terms "Istana" and "Kediaman" are translated as "Palace" and "Residences" in English, respectively. The following December, Sultan Iskandar gave his endorsement for the state government to gazette a proposed legislation which bans Muslims in the state from practising Yoga, citing that Hindu elements in the exercise went against Islamic teachings. Applications to seek the Sultan's consent came from the state religious council, who acted under the instructions of the National Fatwa Council.

Sultan Iskandar graced the official landmark opening of the Sultan Iskandar customs, immigration and quarantine complex on 1 December 2008, in the presence of the Tunku Mahkota and several key cabinet ministers. The complex was named in honour of the Sultan, who expressed optimism in its success during his opening speech.

Foreign relations
Since his ascension to the throne, Sultan Iskandar fostered particularly close neighbourly ties with Singapore, by developing a personal rapport with top Singaporean leaders. This practice has also been taken up by his sons, the Tunku Mahkota and Tunku Aris Bendahara. Media reports highlighted the particularly warm reception which leaders of both countries received whenever they visited each other's domains, particularly in July 1988, when Sultan Iskandar's visit to Singapore marked the first official visit by any Yang di-Pertuan Agong since 1957. Between these years, Sultan Iskandar has been awarded or been given the following awards by Singaporean political leaders:

 1988: Then-Singapore Deputy Prime Minister Goh Chok Tong received the Dato' Paduka Mahkota Johor (Kehormat) from the Sultan himself
 2007: Sultan Iskandar was presented with the Honorary Master Parachutist Wing by then-Singapore Defence Minister Teo Chee Hean
 2007: Conferred the Honorary Degree of Doctor of Laws by the National University of Singapore.

Relations with Singapore took a dive after the International Court of Justice ruled in Singapore's favour following a long legal battle over the sovereignty of Pedra Branca. At the inaugural session of the 12th Johor State Assembly in 2008, the Sultan stated his stand on Malaysia's sovereignty over Pedra Branca, and vowed to find legal means to retrieve the island's sovereignty.

Sultan Iskandar also fostered a fairly close relationship with the Sultan of Brunei, Hassanal Bolkiah, particularly during his days as the Yang Di-Pertuan Agong. In 2006, they were again seen together in public, after Sultan Hassanal Bolkiah made a state visit to Johor to express his interest in Iskandar Development Region.

Controversies

Succession
Prior to his life as the Sultan or Agong, and even during the 1980s and early 1990s, Mahmood's reputation was more or less marred by a number of alleged controversial incidents which received occasional attention from the media. One of these earliest incidents was the loss of his status as Mahkota in 1961—a position which his father, Sultan Ismail, appointed to him two years earlier, citing reasons of alleged misbehaviour after confidential reports accusing him of incarcerating a policeman reached the Sultan. Iskandar's younger brother, Abdul Rahman (Tunku Mahkota of Johor) was appointed as the Tunku Mahkota in favour of him. Nevertheless, in 1966, Mahmood Iskandar was appointed the Raja Muda—which puts him second in line to the throne. In April 1981, Mahmood was reinstated as Mahkota shortly before his father's death the following month and was subsequently installed as the Sultan of Johor, under the orders of his father.

However, some eyewitnesses challenged the legitimacy of Mahmood's reappointment as the Mahkota, by arguing that they witnessed Sultan Ismail already having lapsed into coma at the time of his appointment as the Regent. Records stated that Sultan Ismail lapsed into a coma on 8 May, three days before his death. Relations with the Menteri Besar of Johor, Othman Saat deteriorated when the latter questioned Iskandar's legitimacy to the throne, which led to an incident which saw the Sultan issuing an order to the Menteri Besar to vacate his office within 24 hours, shortly after Sultan Ismail's death, citing reasons for the need for that office space for his own. The Menteri Besar heeded his order, though the Sultan did not move in as he had said. Othman Saat subsequently resigned the following year as the Menteri Besar.

Allegations of criminal misconduct
In 1972, Mahmood was charged for causing assault with a mace to two men for overtaking his car and was convicted the following year. A year later, reports also surfaced another similar attack upon a young couple, when Iskandar, together with his bodyguard, attacked them with chemicals and a mace after having offended him. Another alleged incident took place at about this time when Mahmood chained up two policemen in a dog kennel for a day after having angered him.

Five years later, Mahmood was charged and convicted of manslaughter after shooting and killing a man near his private helicopter whom he took to be a smuggler. In both cases, his father, Sultan Ismail, intervened and granted official pardons to Mahmood. Similarly, his eldest son, Tunku Ibrahim Ismail, was convicted in the 1980s of shooting dead a man in a nightclub during a feud, but was quickly pardoned.

In 1987, Sultan Iskandar was accused of causing the death of a golf caddy in Cameron Highlands by assault, following an incident in which the golf caddy laughed when the Sultan missed a hole. Tunku Abdul Rahman, Malaysia's first Prime Minister, pointed out that the Sultan (then the Agong) could not be prosecuted due to the immunity that was accorded to the rulers, yet he condemned Sultan Iskandar's actions at the same time. In the end the matter was let off without much public attention. The brother of the caddy – who also suffered injuries from the incident, being distressed from what he saw, subsequently ran amok in Kuala Lumpur and had to be quarantined in a mental hospital.

Gomez Incident

Assault
In late 1992, two separate assault cases by the Sultan himself as well as his younger son, Tunku Abdul Majid Idris, on hockey coaches culminated in the stripping of immunity of rulers from prosecution. Both cases received considerable headlines in the local and international news which was aptly dubbed as "The Gomez Incident". The incident was kicked off on 10 July 1992, when Sultan Iskandar's second son, the Tunku Bendahara– Tunku Abdul Majid Idris, lost his temper during a hockey match with the Perak hockey team after Perak won the match by a penalty stroke, and assaulted the Perak goalkeeper, Mohamed Ja'afar Mohamed Vello. The goalkeeper later lodged a police report on 30 July. The incident received public attention, especially when the matter was debated in parliament. The incident resulted in the Malaysian Hockey Federation issuing Majid -- then second-in line to the throne after his elder brother -- a ban of five years from participating in any tournaments following investigations. Tunku Abdul Majid was later convicted of assault in January 1993, of which the chief justice sentenced him to a year in prison, on top of a RM 2000 fine. He was released on a bail, and these charges were later dropped on grounds of immunity, which was still applicable at the time when the act was committed.

The Sultan responded to the ban by putting pressure on the state authorities to enforce isolation of the Johor hockey teams from all national tournaments. In November 1992, Douglas Gomez, a coach for the Maktab Sultan Abu Bakar field hockey team, expressed his displeasure of being called to withdraw from a semi-final national hockey match by the Director of the Johor Education Department. The incident attracted the attention of the Sultan, who personally summoned Gomez to his palace, Istana Bukit Serene, where he was promptly reprimanded and assaulted by the Sultan. Following Gomez's meeting with the Sultan, Gomez sought treatment to his face and stomach. Subsequently, he lodged a police report against the Sultan for assault. Gomez elaborated that the Sultan's bodyguards and members of the Johor Military Force present were merely onlookers, and that the Sultan was solely responsible for the injuries.

Public responses and follow ups
The assault resulted in a public outcry over the event which pressured all levels of the government right up to the top ranks of the federal government to investigate into the matter. In the closing months of 1992, and also the opening months of 1993, dozens of articles mentioning misdeeds by the royal families of several states–but in particular Sultan Iskandar himself were published. A good deal of these alleged misdeeds that were mentioned included the charging of exorbitant fines–way above the prescribed legal limits–upon offenders who had obstructed the Sultan's car, amongst others. Sultan Iskandar, nevertheless bore the brunt of the backlash by the numerous references centred towards alleged acts of criminal wrongdoings even though many of the listed acts were committed by other members of the royal family.

The vociferous spate of criticisms roused by the press prompted Members of Parliament of the Dewan Rakyat to convene a special session on 10 December 1992. All 96 parliamentarians present on that day passed a unanimous resolution which called for action to curb the powers of the rulers if necessary. During the special meeting, parliamentarians disclosed past criminal records of Sultan Iskandar and his two sons, all of whom had been involved in a total of at least 23 cases of assault and manslaughter, five of which were cases committed by the Sultan after 1981, two cases by the Mahkota and three cases by the Bendahara.

A bill was passed by both the Dewan Rakyat and Dewan Negara on 19 and 20 January 1993 respectively. The bill, which proposed to remove legal immunity was approved by six out of nine sultans—but saw stiff opposition from three, two of which included Ismail Petra, the Sultan of Kelantan and the Sultan Iskandar himself. Sultan Iskandar took up the initiative to obtain more royal support to stall the implementation of the proposed bill. The bill, which proposed to strip rulers and members of the royal families of legal immunity, would make them prosecutable by the law in any cases of proven criminal wrongdoings.

Sultan Iskandar organised a rally which was to be held outside the palace with the aim of garnering public support to stall the bill's implementation. However, this was cancelled after intense pressure from the government. A report made during the rally quoted Sultan Iskandar calling upon all local civil servants to boycott state and federal functions in a show of support for his motion. Meanwhile, the federal government continued to pressure the rulers into assenting to the bills, which they did after several revisions of the bill were made by the government.  Following which, the proposed bill was enshrined into the Federal Constitution in March 1993.

The bill allowed rulers who violated the laws to be prosecuted, while the Sedition Act of 1948 was also amended to allow public criticism of the rulers. A special court was created–presided by the Lord President of the Federal Court–to empower and prosecute members of the rulers and immediate members of the royal household.

Aftermath

Sultan Iskandar and his family members were not prosecuted for their past violations of the law on grounds that the royal immunity was still applicable when the incidences occurred. Nevertheless, shortly after the incident, Sultan Iskandar was prompted to take steps to rehabilitate his public image, which was more or less tarnished by the incident. In a public speech shortly after the episode, the Sultan was noted to have toned down somewhat on his hardline image and appeared to be somewhat more humble, appealing to Johoreans to maintain their loyalty to him.

The Gomez incident also led to a review and proposal by the Federal Government in August 1993 to disband the Johor Military Force (JMF). However, the bill to disband the JMF was subsequently repealed by parliament.

Political

Days as the Yang di-Pertuan Agong of Malaysia (1980s)
Shortly before his election as the Yang-Di Pertuan Agong in 1983, a spate of reports alleging Sultan Iskandar's intention to launch a coup d'état by launching a state of emergency to overthrow the government circulated within political circles, which reached Mahathir himself. The Sultan was reportedly having fostered close relations with several key military personnel, including the Army chief himself Jeneral Zain Hashim. The government subsequently took action to curb constitutional loopholes within the constitution and took to task of reducing the power of royal veto in passing legislation, culminating to a constitutional crisis in late 1983. Nevertheless, during his inaugural speech as the Agong in 1984, about a month after the constitutional amendments were passed in parliament, Sultan Iskandar voiced public support for the revised constitution and pledged to act in accordance to the Prime Minister's advise.

A diplomatic scandal between the United Kingdom and Malaysia broke out in 1984, when several British newspapers published pieces on Sultan Iskandar's coronation, citing the headlines such as  "Killer becomes King" and "King a Killer", which enraged the Malaysian government, who demanded an apology from the British government. The British government refused to apologise on behalf of the newspapers, hence triggering tensions between the two countries. Two months later, in June 1984, Sultan Iskandar in his capacity as the Agong, surprised the Malaysian public when he publicly called upon the Deputy Prime Minister, Musa Hitam, to make a public apology in front of the entire congregation present at the National Mosque. Sultan Iskandar, on his part, was angry over remarks which Musa made during the course of the 1983 constitutional crisis that he deemed to be disrespectful. Musa abided to the Agong's demand and boldly came forward to make the apology, which was greeted by a thunderous applause from the entire congregation. The event, which was broadcast live throughout the nation on Malaysian Radio (although the television stations abruptly terminated its broadcast halfway), was seen by many observers as an act of confrontation by the Agong to put Musa in his place.

In 1988, also serving in his capacity as the Yang-Di Pertuan Agong, the Lord President of the Federal Court Tun Salleh Abas was sacked by the Agong in what led to the 1988 Malaysian constitutional crisis. However, observers suggested a remarkably warm relationship between then-Prime Minister Dr. Mahathir Mohamad with the Agong, both of whom shared common resentment against the chief justice, Salleh Abas. In 1973, Iskandar was convicted of assault and was sentenced to six months imprisonment, of which Salleh Abas served as the public prosecutor hearing the case. As the public prosecutor, Salleh had appealed to the chief justice, Raja Azlan Shah (father to the current Sultan of Perak), for handing down a heavier sentence for Iskandar, which naturally earned his wrath. The sacking of the Lord President, was however not without controversy, given the alleged manner in which the Agong and Prime Minister had handled the matter–including an incident which the Agong had refused to forgive the Lord President in spite of Salleh's willingness to offer his apology to the Agong, which he turned down.

Later years (2000 onwards)
Sultan Iskandar's public call to support Abdullah Badawi's administration in October 2006 created a minor stir among Mahathir's supporters, when he remarked that "Mahathir should act like a pensioner". The call came at a time when Mahathir's spate of criticisms against Abdullah's were at its most vociferous period. The Sultan was the first state ruler to publicly defend the policy of the government during the period of Mahathir's criticisms against the Abdullah administration. Earlier sources however, noted Sultan Iskandar's concerns with the deepening rift between Mahathir and Abdullah and had asked to be photographed together with the two leaders during the United Malays National Organisations (UMNO) 60th anniversary celebrations in Johor Bahru.

A month later, in November 2006, another small stir erupted during the launching ceremony of the Iskandar Development Region, when Sultan Iskandar voiced his opinion that the Causeway, which connects Johor and Singapore, should be removed to allow ships to pass through and promoting development of the state. He also remarked that the people should be wary of all foreigners as they were "vultures" and also urged the people not to hold them in high regard, citing his displeasure that his ancestors were "deceived" by dirty tactics employed by colonialists to build the Causeway.

At the inaugural 12th Johor State Assembly Seating in April 2008, a minor controversy erupted when one opposition member of parliament (MP), Gwee Tong Hiang, flouted dress regulations by appearing in a lounge suit and tie instead of the usual official attire and songkok. This resulted in him being dismissed from the assembly chamber shortly before the Sultan's arrival. Gwee, a Democratic Action Party (DAP) MP, reportedly argued that there was no stated order to wear the official attire and songkok and stated his desire to wear a western suit, promptly drew flak from other MPs and the Menteri Besar, Abdul Ghani Othman who had earlier on met to agree to don in the official attire and songkok prior to the assembly, whereby Gwee was absent. The Sultan, apparently angry at Gwee, sharply criticised him two days later and publicly called upon Gwee to seek an audience with him.

Lifestyle
During his days as the Agong, Sultan Iskandar was often seen in public carrying a pistol in his waistband, which drew considerable concern and discomfort from the Malaysian public due to his past record of criminal offences. He was also reputed to have led a flamboyant lifestyle, which also drew similar scepticism. He was also known to be a motorbike enthusiast; documentaries on national patriotism would feature Sultan Iskandar, the then-Agong, riding out on a police motorbike and his flamboyant appearance during a few public ceremonies. These documentaries drew criticisms from the Malaysian public, who felt that the television clips of Sultan Iskandar were inappropriate for its theme and national image.

Personal life

In 1956, Mahmood married Josephine Ruby Trevorrow, from Cornwall, United Kingdom, with whom he had four children, including his successor, Ibrahim Ismail and the current queen of Malaysia, Azizah Aminah Maimunah Iskandariah. The marriage ended with divorce in 1962. He remarried in 1961 – shortly before his divorce to Trevorrow, to Tengku Zanariah, who came from the Kelantan royal family. Tengku Zanariah had six children with the Sultan. Analysts such as Kate Wharton have observed that any literal references to Trevorrow's association with Sultan Iskandar was carefully omitted in all official biographies.

As a youth, Mahmood qualified as a pilot, having trained in handling light and medium aircraft and helicopters. He was also apt in handling motorcycles, reportedly possessing the skills to strip a motorcycle down to its component parts and then reassembling it.

The Sultan is also well known for his passion in many types of open-air sports, especially polo and golf. In his later years, he spent much of his free time at the Royal Johor Country Club. In addition, he also played tennis and squash on a regular basis. Within private circles, Sultan Iskandar was fondly known as "Moody", a testimony to his first name "Mahmud." His son, Abdul Majid, inherited his interest in amateur golf and once served as the President of the Malaysian Golf Association.

He is involved in the 1988 Malaysian constitutional crisis which the then prime minister Mahathir Mohamad used his 1992 Gomez beating incident as a leverage to hijack the Malaysian judiciary system by sacking the then Lord of President of the Federal Court of Malaysia (Now known as Chief Justice of Malaysia), Tun Haji Mohamed Salleh bin Abas in an effort to claim his political success.

In addition, he kept a large collection of pets, particularly peacocks, at his Istana Bukit Serene compound, where he lived with the Sultanah. In his youth, Iskandar resided at Istana Bukit Coombe, located at the top of Coombe Hill. It was built upon Dutch architectural designs, and was later renamed Istana Bukit Iskandar. The palace was later demolished in 1987, six years after Sultan Iskandar succeeded his late father as Sultan.

He made a personal friendship with Philippine opposition leader Benigno Aquino Jr. His son picked Aquino up at Changi airport and drove to Johor where he and Aquino had a meeting with the latter days before the former Philippine senator was assassinated.

Issue

Health

After undergoing a coronary bypass operation in the United States in 2000, close aides reported that Sultan Iskandar slowed down somewhat in his pace of life and took to playing golf only on an occasional basis. A bout of bronchitis in January 2008 saw the Sultan being briefly admitted and treated in a local hospital.

Death

Sultan Iskandar died on 22 January 2010 at 7:15 pm at the Puteri Specialist Hospital, Johor Bahru. after being admitted earlier in the day following an illness at age 77. His death was only officially announced at 11:20 pm by Menteri Besar of Johor Datuk Abdul Ghani Othman announced that flags be lowered to half mast Johor starting from 6:00 am to 6:00 pm. He was brought to the Istana Besar, Johor Bahru for laying in state and is buried in the Mahmoodiah Royal Mausoleum the next day at 2:00 pm. Before that, the public was allowed to pay their last respects to Sultan Iskandar from early morning.

Among the royal family were present and other dignitaries were present to give their last respects is the Yang Di-Pertuan Agong Tuanku Mizan Zainal Abidin and Raja Permaisuri Agong Tuanku Nur Zahirah, the Sultan of Brunei Sultan Hassanal Bolkiah, the Raja of Perlis Tuanku Syed Sirajuddin, the Sultan of Pahang Sultan Ahmad Shah, the Sultan of Kedah Sultan Abdul Halim Mu'adzam Shah, the Sultan of Perak Sultan Azlan Shah, the Sultan of Selangor Sultan Sharafuddin Idris Shah, the Yang Dipertuan Besar of Negeri Sembilan Tuanku Muhriz, the Regent of Perlis Tuanku Syed Faizuddin Putra Jamalullail, the Tengku Mahkota of Pahang Tengku Abdullah, and the Tengku Mahkota of Kelantan Tengku Muhammad Faris Petra. Prime Minister Dato' Seri Najib Tun Razak, cut short his visit to India to attend his funeral. Also present were Singapore Prime Minister Lee Hsien Loong and Senior Minister Goh Chok Tong.

His son the Tunku Mahkota of Johor Tunku Ibrahim Ismail was proclaimed as the next Sultan of Johor also on 23 January.

Legacy
Several projects and institutions were named after the Sultan, including:

Educational institutions

 Institute Sultan Iskandar of Urban Habitat and Highrise, Universiti Teknologi Malaysia
 SMK Tunku Mahmood Iskandar, Sungai Mati, Muar
 SMK Mahmood Iskandar, Parit Saidi, Batu Pahat
 SK Tengku Mahmood Iskandar 1 and 2, Pontian

Buildings

 Bangunan Sultan Iskandar, or the Sultan Iskandar Complex in English, a customs, immigration and quarantine complex opened in December 2008
 Bangunan Sultan Iskandar, Kota Tinggi district office of the Malaysian Public Works Department
 Bangunan Sultan Iskandar, Federal government headquarters for Youth and Sports in Sarawak, located in Kuching, Sarawak.
 Dewan Sultan Iskandar, Universiti Teknologi Malaysia
 Planetarium Sultan Iskandar the first planetarium in Malaysia. The planetarium is located in Kuching Civic Centre, Kuching, Sarawak. It was named in honour of the Sultan, then the eighth Yang di-Pertuan Agong.
 Sultan Iskandar Broadcasting Complex, headquarters of Johor FM at Jalan Datin Halimah
 Pusat Islam Iskandar Johor, the Johor Islamic Centre in Johor Bahru
 Masjid Iskandar, a mosque at Kem Iskandar, a Commando military camp in Mersing.
 Sultan Iskandar Mosque, a mosque at Mersing and Bandar Dato' Onn
 Kota Iskandar Mosque, a state mosque in Kota Iskandar, Iskandar Puteri.
 Sultan Iskandar Power Station, Pasir Gudang
 Sultan Iskandar Reservoir, a water reservoir east of Johor Bahru.
 Iskandar Coastal Bridge

Roads
Lebuhraya Sultan Iskandar, a stretch of the Iskandar Coastal Highway from Danga Bay to Iskandar Puteri.
Lebuhraya Sultan Iskandar (formerly Lebuhraya Mahameru), part of the Kuala Lumpur Middle Ring Road 1 in Kuala Lumpur.
Jalan Sultan Iskandar, a major road in Bintulu, Sarawak.

Others

 Iskandar Johor Open, an Asian Tour golf tournament funded by the Johor state government
 Iskandar Malaysia, formerly Wilayah Pembangunan Iskandar or Iskandar Development Region (IDR) in English
 Kota Iskandar (formerly Johor State New Administrative Centre (JSNAC)) is an administrative centre for the state government of Johor located at Iskandar Puteri
 Kem Iskandar, a Commando military camp in Mersing
 Iskandar Puteri, a planned city which was formerly known as Nusajaya
 Taman Iskandar, a housing estate near Pasir Pelangi, Johor Bahru
 Sultan Iskandar Deep Sea Park, a deep sea park in Pulau Mensirip, Mersing.
 Pertandingan Menembak Piala Sultan Iskandar

One of his grandsons (the son of his second son, Abdul Majid), Mahmood Iskandar, was named after him. Some of his children and grandchildren are also similarly named after his forebears, notably his older son, Ibrahim, who was named after the Sultan's grandfather, Sultan Ibrahim. Sultan Iskandar also followed his grandfather's and father's footsteps of using the royal monogram "S.I.". The monogram's letters represent the initials of their title and names respectively.

Honours

He was awarded:

Johor honours 
  Second Class (DK II, 8.5.1959), First Class (DK I, 28.10.1959) and Grand Master of the Royal Family Order of Johor
  First Class (SPMJ, 28.10.1967) and Grand Master of the Order of the Crown of Johor
  Knight Grand Commander of the Order of the Loyalty of Sultan Ismail (28.10.1975, SSIJ) 
  Sultan Ibrahim Coronation Medal (PSI 1st class)
  Star of Sultan Ismail (BSI 1st class)
  Sultan Ismail Coronation Medal (1960)

National and Sultanal honours 
  (as Yang di-Pertuan Agong): 
  Recipient of Order of the Royal Family of Malaysia (DKM) (1984)
  Recipient (1987) and Grand Master (1984-1989) of the Order of the Crown of the Realm
  Grand Master (1984-1989) of the Order of the Defender of the Realm
  Grand Master (1984-1989) of the Order of Loyalty to the Crown of Malaysia
  Grand Master (1984-1989) of the Order of Merit of Malaysia
  Grand Master (1984-1989) of the Order of Loyalty to the Royal Family of Malaysia
 :
  Recipient of the Royal Family Order of Kelantan (DK) (1984)
 :
  Recipient of the Royal Family Order of Kedah (DK) (1985)
 :
  Member of the Royal Family Order of Negeri Sembilan (DKNS) (1985)
 :
  First Class Member of the Family Order of the Crown of Indra of Pahang (DK I) (1990)
 :
  Recipient of the Perlis Family Order of the Gallant Prince Syed Putra Jamalullail (DK)
 :
  Member of the first class of the Family Order of Terengganu (DK) (1982)
 :
  First Class of the Royal Family Order of Selangor (DK I) (1985)
 :
  Grand Commander of the Order of Kinabalu (SPDK) – Datuk Seri Panglima
 :
  Grand Commander of the Premier and Exalted Order of Malacca (DUNM) – Datuk Seri Utama (1988)

Foreign honours 
 :
  First Class of the Family Order of Laila Utama (DK) – Dato Laila Utama (1972)
  Recipient of the Royal Family Order of the Crown of Brunei (DKMB) (1988)
 :
 Star of the Republic of Indonesia (1st Class) (1987)
 :
  Knight of the Order of the Rajamitrabhorn (KRM) (1985)

Ancestry
Sultan Iskandar is a fourth generation descendant of Sultan Abu Bakar, who in turn was the son of Temenggong Daeng Ibrahim, the Temenggong of Johor. In turn, some of Daeng Ibrahim's patrilineal ancestors were also Temenggongs of Johor serving under their respective Sultans. It is from this ancestral heritage to which the dynastical name of his lineage is known—Temenggong dynasty. The preceding Sultan prior to Sultan Abu Bakar, Ali and his predecessors who ruled Johor from the 17th to 19th centuries, were descended from Abdul Jalil, a Bendahara. Abdul Jalil became Sultan in 1699 after the death of Sultan Mahmud Shah and adopted the title Sultan Abdul Jalil Shah IV. In this pattern, the names of the dynasties which the ruling houses of Johor were known. The Temenggong dynasty is also related to the Bendahara dynasty by bloodline; genealogical records show that Sultan Abdul Jalil IV is also a direct patrilineal ancestor of Sultan Iskandar.

Footnotes
α.  Al-Mutawakkil Alallah (also spelled in Arabic as Motawakkil Alallah), which means "He who puts his trust in God" is an Islamic title used by the Sultan. (Najeebabadi, pg 465)

β.  In Islamic cultures, the title Al-Marhum means "to one whom mercy has been shown. This is used for Muslim rulers who are deceased. (Schimmel (1989), pg 59)

γ.  His first name, Mahmud, is also sometimes spelled as Mahmood by some sources. Bowker-Saur, pg 297

δ.  In Malaysian royalty, ibni means "son of" in English, derived from the Arabic term "ibn. Most laymen would otherwise use the term "bin" to denote "son of" in their names. Anglo-American Cataloguing Rules (1978), pg 390

ε.  Section B Planning and Implementation, Part 3 Physical Planning Initiatives, CHAPTER 13, Johor Bahru City Centre, Iskandar Malaysia, pg 6, "... This was followed later by the 21st Sultan of Johor – Sultan Abu Bakar (1862–1895) who laid the foundation for developing Johor into a modern state. ..." NB: Sultan Abu Bakar of Johor is the great-grandfather of Sultan Iskandar.

ζ.  On Sultan Iskandar's 69th birthday, various companies and organisations published congratulatory advertisements wishing him well for the birthday. In these advertisements, the Sultan was addressed by his honorary titles and name: Duli Yang Maha Mulia Baginda Al Mutawakkil Alallah Sultan Iskandar Ibni Almarhum Sultan Ismail, D.K. Sultan Dan Yang Dipertuan Bagi Negeri Dan Jajahan Takluk Johor Darul Ta'zim. (His first name "Mahmud" was not mentioned.) Advertisements, 8 April 2001, pg 2–3, 5–7, 9, 11, 13, 15, 17–19, New Sunday Times Special (Sultan of Johor's Birthday)

η.  The Temenggong is a high-ranking Malay official in ancient times, who is responsible to the Sultan. The duty of the Temenggong is to maintain law and order within the kingdom. In the case of Johor during the 19th century, the Sultan's powers were gradually diminished over the decades and it was under Temenggong Daeng Ibrahim when his authority supersedes those of the Sultan, effectively becoming Johor's paramount ruler. (Sardesai (1989), pg 58)

Citations

References

 Abdul Rahman, J. S. Solomon, Challenging Times, Pelanduk Publications, 1985, 
 Abdullah, Kamarulnizam, The Politics of Islam in Contemporary Malaysia, published by Penerbit Universiti Kebangsaan Malaysia, 2003, 
 Adil, Buyong bin, Sejarah Johor, published by Dewan Bahasa dan Pustaka, 1980
 Alagappa, Muthiah, Coercion and Governance: The Declining Political Role of the Military in Asia, published by Stanford University Press, 2001, 
 Andaya, Barbara Watson; Andaya, Leonard Y., A History of Malaysia, published by Macmillan, 1982, 
 Andresen, Paul, Mads Lange fra Bali: Og Hans Efterslaegt Sultanerne af Johor, published by Odense Universitetsforlag, 1992, 
 Asia & Pacific, Pharos Books, published by World of Information, 1984, 
 Banks, Arthur S.; Muller, Thomas C; Overstreet, William R., Political Handbook of Asia 2007, published by CQ Press, 
 Benjamin, Geoffrey; Chou, Cynthia, Tribal Communities in the Malay World: Historical, Cultural and Social Perspectives, published by Institute of Southeast Asian Studies, 2002, 
 Bhattacharyya, Ranjit Kumar, Sarawak, Beautiful and Captivating: Beautiful and Captivating, published by Dewan Bahasa dan Pustaka, Kementerian Pendidikan, Malaysia, 1994, 
 Bowker-Saur, Who's who in Asian and Australasian Politics, 1991, 
 British Broadcasting Corporation Monitoring Service, Summary of World Broadcasts, published by British Broadcasting Corporation, 1993
 Brown, Charles Cuthbert, S?jarah M?layu: Or Malay Annals, Oxford University Press, 1971
 Chang, Li Lin, Koh, Tommy Thong Bee, The Little Red Dot: Reflections by Singapore's Diplomats, published by World Scientific, 2005, 
 Cheong, Mei Sui, Information Malaysia, published by Berita Publ. Sdn. Bhd., 1985
 Cheong, Mei Sui, Information Malaysia, published by Berita Publishing, 2002
 Clad, James, Behind the Myth: Business, Money and Power in Southeast Asia, published by Unwin Hyman, 1989
 Crouch, Harold A., Government and Society in Malaysia, published by Cornell University Press, 1996, 
 De Ledesma, Charles; Lewis, Mark; Savage, Pauline, Malaysia, Singapore and Brunei, published by Rough Guides, 2003, 
 Dowton, Eric, Pacific Challenge: Canada's Future in the New Asia, published by Stoddart, 1986, 
 Federation of Malaya Official Year Book (1962), by Jabatan Penerangan Malaysia (Malaya (Federation)), published by Federal Dept. of Information, Ministry of Information, Malaysia., 1962
 Gorman, Michael; Winkler, Paul Walter, Anglo-American Cataloguing Rules, American Library Association, 1978, 
 Gregory, Ruth Wilhelme; Trawicky, Bernard, Anniversaries and Holidays, ALA Editions, 2000, 
 Haji Ahmad, Siti Rosnah, Pemerintah dan Pemimpin-Pemimpin Kerajaan Malaysia, published by Golden Books Centre, 2006, 
 Haji Othman, Suzana Tun, Institusi Bendahara: Permata Melayu yang Hilang: Dinasti Bendahara Johor-Pahang, published by Pustaka BSM Enterprise, 2002, 
 Horton, A. V. M, Negara Brunei Darussalam: A Biographical Dictionary (1860–1996), 1996, 
 Institute of Southeast Asian Studies, Southeast Asian Affairs, published by Institute of Southeast Asian Studies., 1982, Item notes: 1982
 Ismail, Yahya, Siapa kebal, Mahathir atau Raja-Raja Melayu?, published by Dinamika Kreatif, 1993
 Jurnal Pendidikan, Universiti Malaya Faculti Pendidikan, University of Malaya, by Faculty of Education, published by Faculty of Education, University of Malaya, 1974
 Karim, Gulrose; Tate, Desmond Muzaffar, Information Malaysia, published by Berita Publishing Sdn. Bhd., 1989
 Karim, Gulrose; Tate, Desmond Muzaffar, Information Malaysia, published by Berita Publishing Sdn. Bhd., 1990, Item notes: 1990/91
 Kershaw, Roger, Monarchy in South-East Asia: The Faces of Tradition in Transition, published by Routledge, 2001, 
 Khoo, Kay Kim; Abdullah, Elinah; Wan, Meng Hao, Malays/Muslims in Singapore: Selected Readings in History, 1819–1965, Association of Muslim Professionals (Singapore), Centre for Research on Islamic & Malay Affairs (Singapore), published by Pelanduk Publications, 2006
 Khoo, Kay Kim; Othman, Mohammad Redzuan, Jendela masa: Kumpulan Esei Sempena Persaraan, Penerbit Universiti Malaya, 2001, 
 Low, Donald Anthony, Constitutional Heads and Political Crises: Commonwealth Episodes, 1945–85, published by Macmillan, 1988, 
 Mackie, Ronald Cecil Hamlyn, Malaysia in Focus published by Angus and Robertson, 1964
 Means, Gordon Paul, Malaysian Politics: The Second Generation, published by Oxford University Press, 1991, 
 Milne, Robert Stephen; Mauzy, Diane K., Malaysian Politics Under Mahathir, published by Routledge, 1999, 
 
 Morais, John Victor, Who's who in Malaysia ... & Profiles of Singapore, published by Who's Who Publications, 1982
 Nadarajah, K. N, Tengku Ahmad Rithauddeen: His Story, Pelanduk Publications, 2000, 
 Nadarajah, Nesalamar, Johore and the Origins of British Control, 1895–1914, Arenabuku, 2000, 
 Najeebabadi, Akbar Shah, History of Islam (Vol 2), published by Darussalam, 
 Petts, Judith, Handbook of Environmental Impact Assessment, published by Blackwell Publishing, 1999, 
 Rich, Mark; Copetas, A. Craig, Metal Men: How Marc Rich Defrauded the Country, Evaded the Law, and Became the World's Most Sought-After Corporate Criminal, by A. Craig Copetas, Marc Rich, published by Little Brown, 2001, 
 Richmond, Simon; Cambon, Marie; Rowthorn, Chris; Harper, Damian, Malaysia, Singapore & Brunei, published by Lonely Planet, 2004, 
 Sardesai, D. R., Southeast Asia Past and Present: Past and Present, published by Macmillan Education, 1989, 
 Schimmel, Annemarie, Islamic Names: An Introduction, published by Edinburgh University Press, 1989, 
 Saw, Swee-Hock; Kesavapany, K., Singapore-Malaysia Relations Under Abdullah Badawi, published by Institute of Southeast Asian Studies, 2006, 
 Shome, Anthony S. K.; Shome, Tony, Malay Political Leadership, published by Routledge, 2002, 
 Sleeman, Elizabeth, The International Who's Who 2004, Europa Publications, published by Routledge, 2003, 
 Somun, Hajrudin; Somun-Krupalija, Lejla, Mahathir, the Secret of the Malaysian Success, published by Pelanduk Publications, 2003, 
 Tan, Chee KhoonSistem beraja di Malaysia, by Tan Chee Khoon, published by Pelanduk Publications, 1985
 Tan, Ding Eing, A Portrait of Malaysia and Singapore, published by Oxford University Press, 1978, 
 Taylor & Francis Group, Bernan Associates, The Europa Year Book: A World Survey, Europa Publications Limited, published by Europa Publications, 1984
 Thomas, K.K, Asian Recorder, published by Recorder Press, 1984
 Thomas, K.K, Asian Recorder, published by Recorder Press, 1993
 Winstedt, R. O, A History of Johore (1365–1941), (M.B.R.A.S. Reprints, 6.) Kuala Lumpur: Malaysian Branch of the Royal Asiatic Society, 1992, 

Monarchs of Malaysia
Iskandar
1930 births
2010 deaths
Iskandar
Malaysian aviators
Malaysian people convicted of manslaughter
Marshals of the Royal Malaysian Air Force
People convicted of assault
Iskandar
Recipients of Malaysian royal pardons
Malaysian Muslims
Malaysian people of Malay descent
Malaysian people of Chinese descent
Malaysian people of Danish descent

Iskandar
Iskandar
Iskandar
Knights Grand Commander of the Order of the Loyalty of Sultan Ismail

Recipients of the Darjah Kerabat Diraja Malaysia
First Classes of Royal Family Order of Selangor
First Classes of the Family Order of Terengganu
Grand Commanders of the Order of Kinabalu

20th-century Malaysian politicians
21st-century Malaysian politicians
Recipients of the Order of the Crown of the Realm
First Classes of the Family Order of the Crown of Indra of Pahang
Recipients of the Order of Merit of Malaysia